Hungary water (sometimes called "the Queen of Hungary's Water", Eau de la Reine de Hongary, or "spirits of rosemary") was one of the first alcohol-based perfumes in Europe, primarily made with rosemary.  The oldest surviving recipes call for distilling fresh rosemary and thyme with brandy, while later formulations contain wine, lavender, mint, sage, marjoram, costus, orange blossom and lemon.

Origins 
The exact date of the invention of Hungary water is lost to history, though some sources say it dates to 1370 or the late 14th century. It is equally unclear who in particular created it. According to legend, it was formulated at the command of the Queen Elizabeth of Hungary, sometimes identified as Queen Isabella of Hungary or in one document "Saint Elisabeth, Queen of Hungary". Some sources say that a hermit or monk-recluse first gave it to the Queen of Hungary, though most likely it was made by a court alchemist or a monk-alchemist. The water was given to the queen in order to help her headaches. These legends mostly date to the early to mid-17th century, so the details may have become confused in the intervening centuries.

Namesake 
The queen in question is frequently assumed to be Elisabeth of Poland (1305–1380), although the particulars of her life do not match those in the more common legends. It is even more unlikely that it could be Saint Elisabeth of Hungary (1207–1231), who is additionally too early and not a queen. The only plausible Queen Isabella (late 13th century) likewise seems to be too early to be a strong candidate, as the invention of this water is most probably related to the Black Death epidemic that ravaged Europe between 1346 and 1350 caused by a bacterial infection. This could potentially be due to the antibacterial effects found in the wine or brandy and rosemary that was used to make the water.

Spread through Europe 
According to legends, Hungary water first appeared outside of Hungary in 1370 when Charles V of France, who was famous for his love of fragrances, received some. Its use was popular across Europe for many centuries, and until Eau de Cologne appeared in the 18th century, it was the most popular fragrance and remedy applied.

French Hungary water 
By the 18th century, French Hungary water from Montpellier was being touted over other variations of Hungary water, because of the quality of the rosemary used in the distillation. Advertisements in newspapers even warned against counterfeit versions of French Hungary water, explaining to potential buyers how to detect the difference in quality.

Medicinal Use 
Hungary water was used during the late 17th century as a form of medicine. It was believed to have many uses such as helping to relieve a headache, toothache, or ringing ears. It was also used to help cleanse the body by clearing out several of the vital organs of impurities. Some even believed that it helped reduce blindness and the inability to hear. It was one of the medicines at the time that could be considered a "cure all" meaning that it would help with almost every ailment a person could face. The medicine was made through a distillation process that included concentrating the ingredients involved, which often included rosemary and wine. Hungary water as a medicine was used for men, women, and children alike. The dosage was only 1-2 sips of the medicine or have it applied topically depending on if the ailment was internal or external

Other Uses 
Similar to other herb and flower-based products, Hungary water was also a valuable remedy, with recipes advising the user to wash with it or drink it in order to receive the most benefit. Other times, it was recommended to be added to other prepared distilled waters to use when washing ones face in order to help prevent irritation and breakouts. It was even thought to help people maintain youthful appearance and beauty.

Notes

References

See also 
 Toilet water
 Carmelite Water
 Florida Water
 Eau de Cologne

History of cosmetics
Perfumes
Traditional medicine